NHL 06 is an ice hockey video game that was released in 2005. The game includes the Sega Genesis version of NHL '94 on the PlayStation 2 version.

Reception
The game received "generally favorable reviews" on all platforms according to the review aggregation website Metacritic.

References

External links

2005 video games
Electronic Arts games
GameCube games
PlayStation 2 games
Xbox games
Windows games
NHL (video game series)
EA Sports games
Video games set in 2005
Video games set in 2006
Video games set in the United States
Video games set in Canada
Video games developed in Canada
Multiplayer and single-player video games